Statue of Edmund Burke may refer to:
Statue of Edmund Burke, Bristol, a statue in Bristol, England
Edmund Burke (Thomas), a statue in Washington, D.C., United States